The United States Marine Corps Reconnaissance Battalions (or commonly called Marine Division Recon) are the Special Operations Capable reconnaissance assets of Marine Air-Ground Task Force that provide division-level ground and amphibious reconnaissance to the Ground Combat Element within the United States Marine Corps. Division reconnaissance teams are employed to observe and report on enemy activity and other information of military significance in close operations. The Military Occupational Specialty code for Reconnaissance Marine is 0321.

Role

Reconnaissance forces are a valuable asset to the Marine Air-Ground Task Force when the MEF Commander is faced with uncertainty in the battlefield. Reconnaissance provides timely intelligence to command and control for battlespace shaping, allowing the MAGTF to act, and react, to changes in the battlefield. While Marine reconnaissance assets may operate in specialized missions, they are unlike the unconventional SOCOM's forces counterparts. Both division and force are solely reserved for supporting the infantry, which are directly involved in the commander's force of action  in the battlefield, or battlespace shaping.

Many of the types of reconnaissance missions that are conducted by Marine Recon units are characterized by its degree in depth of penetration. This greatly increases the mission time, risk, and support coordination needs. Division reconnaissance are in charge of the commander's Area of Influence, the close and distant battlespace; the force reconnaissance platoons are employed farther in the deep battlespace, or the Area of Interest.

These are the main missions that are outlined to some, or all of, the reconnaissance assets in the Marine Corps:

 Plan, coordinate, and conduct amphibious-ground reconnaissance and surveillance to observe, identify, and report enemy activity, and collect other information of military significance.
 Conduct specialized surveying to include:  underwater reconnaissance and/or demolitions, beach permeability and topography, routes, bridges, structures, urban/rural areas, helicopter landing zones (LZ), parachute drop zones (DZ), aircraft forward operating sites, and mechanized reconnaissance missions.
 When properly task organized with other forces, equipment or personnel, assist in specialized engineer, radio, mobile, and other special reconnaissance missions.
 Infiltrate mission areas by necessary means to include:  surface, subsurface and airborne operations.
 Conduct counter-reconnaissance.
  Conduct Initial Terminal Guidance (ITG) for helicopters, landing craft, parachutists, air-delivery, and re-supply.
 Designate and engage selected targets with organic weapons and force fires to support battlespace shaping. This includes designation and terminal guidance of precision-guided munitions.
 Conduct post-strike reconnaissance to determine and report battle damage assessment on a specified target or area.
 Conduct limited scale raids and ambushes.

Organization

A Marine Corps Reconnaissance Battalion consists of five companies - a Headquarters Company and four "line" companies named Alpha, Bravo, Charlie and Force.

Each line company has a headquarters element and two platoons - a reconnaissance and surveillance (R&S) platoon and a visit, board, search, and seizure (VBSS) platoon.

Deep Reconnaissance Platoons

Deep Reconnaissance Platoons, or DRPs, are units within Recon Battalions that carry out the role of Force Reconnaissance. The first DRPs were formed in March 1975 after the conclusion of American involvement in the Vietnam War, when the Marine Corps was downsized; Force Recon was reduced to a single regular company. Both 1st and 3d Battalion received a 23-man Deep Reconnaissance Platoon. DRPs gained additional importance in 2006, when all active-duty Force Recon companies were transferred to Marine Corps Forces Special Operations Command and became Marine Special Operations Battalions. Force Recon Marines not in an MSOB became part of the DRPs, which were placed in the Delta Companies of the 1st, 2nd and 3rd Recon Battalions.

Standard Recon Platoon

The standard recon platoon in a Recon Battalion consists of:

Platoon Commander: First Lieutenant or Captain

Platoon Sergeant: Gunnery Sergeant

Field Radio Operator: Corporal or Sergeant

Special Equipment NCO: Sergeant

Special Amphibious Reconnaissance Corpsman (SARC): First, Second, or Third Class Petty Officer

Recon Teams ×3
Team Leader: Staff Sergeant or Sergeant
Assistant Team Leader: Sergeant or Corporal
Radio Operator: Sergeant or Corporal
Assistant Radio Operator: Corporal or Lance Corporal
Point Man: Corporal or Lance Corporal
Slackman: Corporal or Lance Corporal.

Training

Table of equipment
All amphibious recon Marines [Force and Division] and Corpsmen [IDC Corpsmen and SARC] are provided general issued equipment, these are the weapons that are generally used by both MAGTF Recon assets. These weapons are generally used by most other Marines in the infantry, except with minor modifications. Although Force Recon units receive the same equipment as their division recon counterparts, they also have equipment similar to that issued to comparable USSOCOM units. Force Recon are assigned to missions remote from any available fire support and fully rely on specialized weapons that are versatile enough to be flexible in the commander's area of interest.

 Data Automated Communications Terminal (DACT) – The DACT system, built and designed by Raytheon, is similar to a hand-held Personal Digital Assistant (PDA) that allows the commanders a Common Operational Picture (COP) to their platoons/teams through battalion/regimental levels. The DACT provides immediate person-to-person communications and feedback, such as positional data, situational awareness (SA), and communications tools providing Command and Control (C2) capabilities. The recon platoons/teams use two variants of the DACT systems, which are made available, the Mounted (M-DACT), which are mounting on tactical vehicles; and the Dismounted (D-DACT) for the Marines on foot or patrol.

Weapons
 OKC-3S Bayonet
 M16A4 Service Rifle *with/without M203 grenade launcher attachment
 M4/M4A1 Service Rifle *with/without M203 grenade launcher attachment
 MEU (SOC) Service Pistol
 M40A5 Sniper Rifle *used by the detached Scout Sniper Platoons
 M110 Semi-Automatic Sniper System *used by the detached Scout Sniper Platoons
 M82A3 SASR .50 Anti-Material Weapon
 M249 Squad Automatic Weapon (SAW) being phased out by the M27 IAR
 Mk19, Mod 3 40-mm Automatic Grenade Launcher
 M240 7.62-mm General Purpose Machine Gun (GPMG)
 M2HB .50-cal Heavy Machine Gun
 M61 and M67 Fragmentation grenade
 MK3A2 Concussion grenade (offensive)
 M18 Colored Smoke and AN-M8 HC White Smoke grenade
 ABC-M25A1/A2 Riot Control and ABC-M7A2/3 CS gas grenade
 AN-M14 TH3 Incendiary and M15 White Phosphorus grenade
 M69 practice hand grenade
 XM84 Stun grenade

Combat and protective gear
The combative and protective gear is used by both recon assets of MAFTF. However, again, there are 'additional' equipment in the Force Recon's T/E to meet their assignments in deep operations and/or direct action missions. And to include FORECON's necessary equipment that are capable of being jumped out of aircraft; and long-range communications due to their operability at greater distances than Division Recon geographically-assigned boundaries.

 Utility uniform – Marine Corps Combat Utility Uniform (MCCUU), with MARPAT camouflage digital pixelated pattern in woodland and desert variants.
 Load Bearing Vest (LBV) – The vest could be the current standard-issue, second-generation, MOLLE Fighting Load Carrier vest (FLC) or the late 1980s to early 1990s IIFS non-modular load bearing vest (LBV-88). The latter is more popular for durability. An operator may also use a third-party LBV, and chestrigs are popular.
 Rucksack – A large backpack for items accessed less often. Marines have publicly voiced a preference for ALICE packs, introduced in 1974, over the newer MOLLE packs, but individual operators may buy third-party packs which surpass both products in durability. The MOLLE packs were replaced by the Arc'teryx-designed ILBE.
 First aid kit – A personal-sized first aid kit that is carried usually fastened onto webbing of the rucksack or personal vest carrying system.
 Tactical knee pads and elbow pads – For protection and comfort as Marines move into various firing positions.
 Boots – Equipment-bearing hiking boots or specialized hiking shoes.
 Combat Helmet and tactical goggles – Lightweight Helmet or other Kevlar helmets
 Nomex balaclava – A hood with a large opening for the eyes. NOMEX is a flame retardant fabric that was developed during post-Korean War era for use by aircraft pilots that has since been found useful for many other applications.
 Ballistic vest – Interceptor Body Armor. Marine Corps's Modular Tactical Vest (MTV)

Special equipment

Most of the recon patrols or insertions are either in maritime, amphibious environments or on the ground. They have to rely on equipment that is essential to their mission. Both recon assets contain a Table of Equipment (T/E) that has combatant diving equipment. A Marine within a recon platoon will be assigned as the "Special Equipment NCO", fully responsible for the procurement and maintenance of the equipment when operating in the field.

Force Recon's Parachute Loft, or Paraloft section has in addition to their "mission-essential" equipment, the Parachutist Individual Equipment Kit (PIEK) and Single Action Release Personal Equipment Lowering Equipment (SARPELS) for their parachute capabilities.

Combatant diving
The scuba equipment listed under the T/E set by the US Navy for the Marine Corps reconnaissance:
 Draeger MK 25 rebreather unit – The rebreather unit is a pure oxygen SCUBA system that scrubs the diver's exhalation of carbon dioxide and recycles the remaining oxygen into the breathing loop. Since it is closed-circuit, it does not release a trail of bubbles unless the diver is surfacing faster than the oxygen is consumed. Bubbles could reveal the presence and location of the diver and compromise the mission.
 Deep See Squeeze Lock – diving knife with a  beta-titanium blade. Useful when snagged in fishing nests or other submerged entanglements, many of which are nearly non-visible underwater.
 Aqua Lung Military Snorkel Flex Tube – Standard-issue snorkel.
 Aqua Lung Rocket Fin  – Standard-issue swimfins.
 Aqua Lung Look Mask and Mythos Mask – Standard-issue diving mask. Mythos mask contains a blow-out, one-way valve at the nasal piece to expel water that is in the goggles.
 Diver's Weight Belt, (WB67/WB68) – Weight belt is used to neutralize excess buoyancy under the water.
 Case Soft Diving Weights, (September-M-2/Sep-M-5) – Additional weights that can be released individually to proper buoyant level.
 Scubapro Twin Jet Fins – Split fins are fairly new to the Marine Corps T/E, since 2000. They have been tested to prove that the split fin design allows slightly better maneuverability if one had to immediately run during unexpected enemy contact once ashore. It also has excellent water propulsion to push the recon Marines and Corpsmen to shore.
 Aqua Lung Impulse 2 Snorkel – This snorkel contains a one-way valve that prevents water from entering the diver's mouth.
 UDT life preserver – Standard-issued life preserver.

History

The Marine Corps's division-level reconnaissance was first conceived in 1941 by Lieutenant Colonel William J. Whaling. He needed a group of specialized scouts and skilled marksmen to form a "Scout and Sniper Company". Two of the newly established Marine divisions, 1st and 2nd Marine Division contained their own scout company. Larger infantry regiments called for more recon, scouts and sniper assets. By 1945, the divisions had instituted and organized their own scout-sniper, light armored reconnaissance (LAR), and division reconnaissance assets.

As a result of MCO 5401.5, dated 24 August 1952, the USMC Force Restructure and Implementation Plan, the Marine Corps shrunk its forces and as a result reconnaissance battalions were eliminated and reconnaissance companies became a part of infantry regiments.

Notes

Creed

Realizing it is my choice and my choice alone to be a Reconnaissance Marine, I accept all challenges involved with this profession. Forever shall I strive to maintain the tremendous reputation of those who went before me.

Exceeding beyond the limitations set down by others shall be my goal. Sacrificing personal comforts and dedicating myself to the completion of the reconnaissance mission shall be my life. Physical fitness, mental attitude, and high ethics—The title of Recon Marine is my honor.

Conquering all obstacles, both large and small, I shall never quit. To quit, to surrender, to give up is to fail. To be a Recon Marine is to surpass failure; To overcome, to adapt and to do whatever it takes to complete the mission.

On the battlefield, as in all areas of life, I shall stand tall above the competition. Through professional pride, integrity, and teamwork, I shall be the example for all Marines to emulate.

Never shall I forget the principles I accepted to become a Recon Marine. Honor, Perseverance, Spirit and Heart.

A Recon Marine can speak without saying a word and achieve what others can only imagine.

"Swift, Silent, Deadly"

See also

 Marine Raider Regiment
 United States Marine Corps Force Reconnaissance
 United States Marine Corps Light Armored Reconnaissance
 Radio Reconnaissance Platoon
 Scout Sniper
 Surveillance and Target Acquisition

References

External links
 1st Recon Battalion Association
 The 2D Reconnaissance Battalion Association
 3rd Recon Association
 Recon & Sniper Foundation
 . Article on changes to the Reconnaissance Battalions' mission brought on by fourth generation warfare. Retrieved on 2008-07-15.